The omohyoid muscle is a muscle that depresses the hyoid. It is located in the front of the neck, and consists of two bellies separated by an intermediate tendon. The omohyoid muscle is proximally attached to the scapula and distally attached to the hyoid bone, stabilising it. Its superior belly serves as the most lateral member of the infrahyoid muscles, located lateral to both the sternothyroid muscles and the thyrohyoid muscles.

Structure
The omohyoid muscle arises from the upper border of the scapula, inserting into the lower border of the body of the hyoid bone.

It has two separate bellies, superior and inferior:

 The inferior belly forms a flat, narrow fasciculus, which inclines forward and slightly upward across the lower part of the neck, being bound down to the clavicle by a fibrous expansion; it then passes behind the sternocleidomastoid, becomes tendinous and changes its direction, forming an obtuse angle.

 The superior belly passes almost vertically upward, close to the lateral border of the sternohyoid, to be inserted into the lower border of the body of the hyoid bone, lateral to the insertion of the sternohyoid.

The central tendon of this muscle varies much in length and form, and is held in position by a process of the deep cervical fascia, which sheaths it, and is prolonged down to be attached to the clavicle and first rib; it is by this means that the angular form of the muscle is maintained. The tendon overlies the internal jugular vein, and can be used as a landmark for this vein during surgery.

Variation
The omohyoid muscle may be doubled or completely absent in some people. It may originate from the clavicle rather than the scapula.

It occasionally arises from the superior transverse scapular ligament, which crosses the scapular notch, its extent of attachment to the scapula varying from a few millimetres to 2.5 cm.

Innervation
The omohyoid is innervated by a branch of the cervical plexus, the ansa cervicalis. The inferior belly of the omohyoid is innervated by the three cervical branches (C1-C3) that make up the ansa cervicalis, while the superior belly is innervated by the superior root of ansa cervicalis which contains only fibers from the first cervical spinal nerves (C1).

Examination of the neck
The inferior belly of the omohyoid divides the posterior triangle of the neck into an upper or occipital triangle and a lower or subclavian triangle. Its superior belly divides the anterior triangle into an upper carotid triangle and a lower muscular triangle.

Name 
The name "omohyoid" derives from the Greek "omos" meaning shoulder, giving one of its attachments, and "hyoid", giving the other attachment – the hyoid bone.

References

External links

 
 
 

Muscles of the head and neck